Git  is a term of insult denoting an unpleasant, silly, incompetent, annoying, senile, elderly or childish person.
As a mild oath it is roughly on a par with prat and marginally less pejorative than berk. Typically a good-natured admonition with a strong implication of familiarity, git is more severe than twit or idiot but less severe than wanker, arsehole or twat when offence is intended.

The word git first appeared in print in 1946, but is undoubtedly older.  It was popularly used by the British army in the First World War at Gallipoli, the Egyptian and Mesopotamian campaigns where the British would abuse their Turkish adversaries by shouting the vulgar, “siktir git!”; (fuck you) the soldiery (mistakenly) believing that “git” was part of the offensive expression meaning “you” (but in a derogatory way). An alternative suggestion for the etymology is that it is an alteration of the word get, dating back to the 14th century.  A shortening of beget, get insinuates that the recipient is someone's misbegotten offspring and therefore a bastard. In parts of northern England, Northern Ireland and Scotland get is still used in preference to git.

The word has been ruled by the Speaker of the House of Commons to be unparliamentary language.

Notable usage
John Lennon calls Walter Raleigh "such a stupid get" in The Beatles song, "I'm So Tired".

In the BBC TV comedy show Till Death us do Part (1965-1975) the bigoted patriarch of the family, Alf Garnett (played by Warren Mitchell) repeatedly referred to his son-in-law, Mike Rawlins (Anthony Booth) as a "randy scouse git". The phrase was later picked up by Micky Dolenz and turned into a song recorded by The Monkees in 1967. The song "Randy Scouse Git" was the first song written by Dolenz to be commercially released, and it became a number 2 hit in the UK where it was retitled "Alternate Title" after the record company (RCA) complained that the original title was actually somewhat "taboo to the British audience".

The word "git" is frequently used as an insult in British sitcoms such as Blackadder and Red Dwarf.

It was in a self-mocking spirit that Linus Torvalds named his Git version control system.

References

English, British
British English
British slang
Pejorative terms for people
English profanity
English words